Zero Mile Freedom Park is a metro station on the Orange (North-South) line of the Nagpur Metro in the city of Nagpur, Maharashtra. It is named after the nearby Zero Mile Stone which was built in 1907 to mark the Great Trigonometrical Survey of India. The station was opened on 21 August 2021.

Design
The Nagpur Metro Rail Corporation (now Mahametro) launched a global competition on 5 June 2015 inviting bids for the Zero Mile and Sitaburdi metro stations. Twenty-three architecture firms submitted designs in response. The metro authority shortlisted 13 firms for the detailed design stage, and eventually requested four firms to submit designs. A panel of architects appointed by the authority to pick the winning design, and the preliminary design of the winning entry was unveiled by the metro authority in May 2016.

The Zero Mile station is a 20-storey building with two basements. The building's facade is made of locally-sourced glass and stone. It is located on a 12,000 square metre plot of land on Wardha Road. Mahametro completed the demolition of a two-storey building of the fisheries department that was previously located on the site in January 2018. 

The station is equipped with 8 escalators, 10 lifts, and also features multi-level parking with a capacity to accommodate 244 cars. Apart from the metro station and related facilities, the station building also contains hotels, restaurants, commercial places, offices, and a banquet hall. Zero Mile station also provides connectivity with the heritage walk around the Zero Mile Stone and Shaheed Smarak monuments. Also located near the station are an amphitheatre and a survey museum that will display the results of surveys conducted during the British Raj.

A Potain Tower Crane was utilized to speed up construction of the station.

Station Layout

References

Nagpur Metro stations
Railway stations in India opened in 2021
Proposed railway stations in India